Sindorim-dong is a dong, neighbourhood of Guro-gu in Seoul, South Korea.

Sindorim-dong is the main transportation point where the Gyeongin-ro and western highway are interlocked with Sindorim Station, the transfer station for Seoul subway lines No. 1 and 2. Recently, the move into high-rise multipurpose building, office-residential building, and apartment complexes has rapidly emerged as a new type of construction site and commercial district in southwestern Seoul.

Education 
 Seoul Sindorim Elementary School
 Seoul Sinmirim Elementary School
 Sindorim Middle school
 Sindorim High School

Traffic 
 Seoul Subway Line 1. Sindorim Station
 Seoul Subway Line 2. Sindorim Station

 Seoul Subway Line 1. Guro Station
 Gyeonginno
 Seobu Ganseondoro

See also 
Administrative divisions of South Korea

References

External links
 Guro-gu official website
 Map of Guro-gu at the Guro-gu official website
 Sindorim-dong resident office website
 Chronicle of Beopjeong-dong and Haengjeong-dong at the Guro-gu official website

Neighbourhoods of Guro District, Seoul